Zha Blong Xiong is an associate professor in the Department of Family Social Science in the College of Education and Human Development at the University of Minnesota, Twin Cities, USA. He specializes in adjustment of adolescents, parent/adolescent relationships in immigrant families, and parent education. In less than 20 years Xiong has gone from being a refugee who spoke no English to becoming the first Hmong tenured professor at the University of Minnesota and the first at a major research university in the United States.

Early life and education
Xiong was born in Laos. His family came to the United States as refugees, arriving in Minnesota in February 1982 when he was 15 years old. He had "very little formal education" prior to attending high school, first in Rosemount and then in Hastings the following year, where he decided to start over, enrolling in 9th grade again.

After graduating from high school Xiong attended Winona State University, earning a B.A. in psychology. He then attended the University of Minnesota, Twin Cities, where he earned an M.A. and Ph.D. in family social science with a dissertation entitled "Hmong American Parent-Adolescent Problem-Solving Interactions: An Analytic Induction Analysis".

Honors & Awards 
 2011, Lee Knefelkamp Research Award, Minnesota College Personnel Association, Minnesota
 2014, Outstanding Leadership Award, Lao Family Foundation
 2017, Certificate of Outstanding Leadership, Hmong 18 Council, Inc.
 2017, Community Outreach and Engagement Faculty Award, College of Education and Human Development

References

 Making an Impact: Zha Blong Xiong is a force within academia—and his Hmong community

American sociologists
University of Minnesota faculty
Winona State University alumni
University of Minnesota College of Education and Human Development alumni
American people of Hmong descent
Living people
Year of birth missing (living people)